Castellani is a surname of Italian origin.

Castellani may also refer to:

 Castellani (people), an ancient Iberian or pre-Roman people of the Iberian peninsula
 Castellani (wine), an Italian wine company 
 Castellani Painter, a 6th-century BC Attic vase painter

See also

Castellan, medieval European governor of a castle
Castellano (surname)
Altocumulus castellanus cloud